Cincuentenario is Spanish for the Fiftieth Anniversary. It can denote the following objects:

 Cincuentenario, a rapid transit station in Panama City
 Estadio Cincuentenario, an indoor arena in Formosa, Argentina